Union of Muslims of Ceuta (in Spanish: Unión de Musulmanes de Ceuta) is a political party in Ceuta, Spain. The president of the party is Mohammed Hamid. The party was registered in 2002.

The party had presented a candidature for the 2003 municipal elections, but it was withdrawn ahead of the vote.

Political parties in Ceuta
Islamic organisations based in Spain
Political parties established in 2002
2002 establishments in Spain
Berbers in Spain
Islamic political parties